The Battle of Blaauwberg, also known as the Battle of Cape Town, fought near Cape Town on Wednesday 8 January 1806, was a small but significant military engagement during the Napoleonic Wars. After a British victory, peace was made under the Treaty Tree in Woodstock.  It established British rule over the Dutch Cape Colony, which was to have many ramifications for the region during the nineteenth and twentieth centuries.  A bi-centennial commemoration was held in January 2006.

Background
At that time, the Cape Colony belonged to the Batavian Republic, a French vassal.  Because the sea route around the Cape was important to the British, they decided to seize the colony in order to prevent it—and the sea route—from also coming under French control.  A British fleet was despatched to the Cape in July 1805, to forestall French troopships which Napoleon had sent to reinforce the Cape garrison.

The colony was governed by Lieutenant General Jan Willem Janssens, who was also commander-in-chief of its military forces.  The forces were small and of poor quality, and included foreign units hired by the Batavian government.  The force Janssens managed to scrounge up included a regiment of foreign mercenaries from Waldeck, two regular Batavian battalions, a squadron of Batavian light dragoons, a troop of Batavian horse artillery and over 200 sailors and marines from two beached French warships, Atlante and Napoleon. The local troops Janssens mustered for the battle included 181 Hottentots, 224 Burghers out of Swellendam organized as Dragoons and 54 Javanese artillerists with 104 Mozambican slaves serving as their auxiliaries, wagon drivers and carriers.

Events

The British force, under Baird, departed England at August. The squadron included 9 warships & many transport vessels under the command of Cmdre. Home Riggs Popham, assembled from two fleets out of Cork and Falmouth. Popham took the 64 gun HMS Diadem as his flagship, his warships included the 64 gun ships HMS Raisonnable and HMS Belliqueur, 50 gun HMS Diomede, 38 gun HMS Leda, 32 gun HMS Narcissus, 18 gun HMS Espoir, 14 gun HMS Encounter and HMS Protector. The Honourable East India Company ships Dutchess of Gordon, Sir William Pulteney, Europe, Streatham, Union, Comet, Northampton, Glory and William Pitt ferried the invasion force at their holds.

The first British warship reached the Cape on Christmas Eve 1805, and attacked two supply ships off the Cape Peninsula. The government instructed Baird that the colony would be "defended by not more than 1500 Regular Troops, not of the best description; and that the Militia and Inhabitants look with anxiety for the Arrival of a British Force". Although Baird received two more communiques, the 2nd providing an estimate of 1500-2000 regular enemy troops, and a 3rd warning of the possibility of 1000-1200 French troops arriving to the cape, carried by French ships that slipped out of Rochefort. By July, a British officer who visited the cape as a passenger of a Danish ship, provided Baird with more fresh eyewitness estimates, communicating to him to expect 2000 European Troops, 800 Hottentots and roughly 200 cavalry & artillerists, combined with earlier reports of French troops potentially arriving to the cape from Rochefort, this brought the total estimate of the defending force of the cape to 4,500. Later still, A Royal Navy Captain named Woodruff sent a letter providing estimates from late July, indicating "1500 Regulars, or thereabouts, and 1500 Hottentots, free blacks, and Burghers of every description" although this letter arrived to Britain after Baird has already departed to South Africa. Janssens placed his garrison on alert after receiving reports of the upcoming British invasion.  When the main fleet sailed into Table Bay on 4 January 1806, he mobilised the garrison, declared martial law, and called up the militia.

After a delay caused by rough seas, two British infantry brigades, under the command of Lt Gen Sir David Baird, landed at Melkbosstrand, north of Cape Town, on 6 and 7 January. Popham ordered a small merchantman to be scuttled at Losperd's Bay to form a breakwater, and Baird started landing his troops. 36 men of the highland 93rd foot drowned during the landing operation when their boat capsized, and some dragoons from the Swellendam Burghers skirmished with them to delay the landing (Janssens did not want to fight a battle on the shoreline, fearing bombardment by the British ships' broadsides). Janssens moved his forces to intercept them.  He had decided that "victory could be considered impossible, but the honour of the fatherland demanded a fight".  His intention was to attack the British on the beach and then to withdraw to the interior, where he hoped to hold out until the French troopships arrived.

However, on the morning of 8 January, while Janssens's columns were still slowly moving through the veld, Baird's brigades began their march to Cape Town, and reached the slopes of the Blaauwberg mountain (now spelled "Blouberg"), a few kilometres ahead of Janssens.  Janssens halted and formed a line across the veld.

The battle began at sunrise, with exchanges of artillery fire.  These were followed by an advance by Janssens's militia cavalry, and volleys of musket fire from both sides. Janssens' hired regiment of mercenary regulars out of Waldeck, placed at the centre of his line, fled from the field when the British 71st foot reached within only 90 meters of them, without firing a single shot, exposing the Batavian centre. The two regiments to its flanks (the 22st line and 9th Batavian rifles), which promptly began to collapse, though Janssens managed to rally some of his troops and keep them at the fray. The 200 French sailors and marines, despite having their flanks exposed due to the Batavian line routing, fought ferociously and resisted the attack longer than the rest. 10 pieces of foot artillery placed in the centre, manned by 54 Javanese artillerists and 104 Mozambican slaves, were firing at the advancing Highlanders. A gallant charge of the highland 71st foot captured the guns after a ferocious defence from the Javanese artillerists. As Janssens' centre began collapsing, he ordered a withdrawal, which his regulars promptly commenced, but his militia and auxiliary troops did not carry out immediately, engaging the British in a fighting withdrawal before being forced to flee due to the increasing pressure of the British attack.

Janssens began the battle with 2,049 troops, and lost either 337 or 353 in casualties and desertions Although Baird gives the tally as "reputed to exceed 700 Men in killed and wounded", though he implicitly admitted uncertainty of the enemy's total losses. Baird began the battle with 5,399 men, and his troops suffered 204 casualties in the form of 189 wounded and 15 killed.

From Blaauwberg, Janssens moved inland to a farm in the Tygerberg area, and from there his troops moved to the Elands Kloof in the Hottentots Holland Mountains, about 50 km from Cape Town.

The British forces reached the outskirts of Cape Town on 9 January.  To spare the town and its civilian population from attack, the commandant of Cape Town, Lieutenant-Colonel Hieronymus Casimir von Prophalow, sent out a white flag.  He handed over the outer fortifications to Baird, and terms of surrender were negotiated later in the day.
The formal Articles of Capitulation for the town and the Cape Peninsula were signed the following afternoon, 10 January, at a cottage at Papendorp (now the suburb of Woodstock) which became known as "Treaty Cottage." Although the cottage has long since been demolished, Treaty Street still commemorates the event. The tree under which they signed remains to this day.

However, the Batavian Governor of the Cape, General Janssens, had not yet surrendered himself and his remaining troops and was following his plan to hold out for as long as he could, in the hope that the French troopships for which he had been waiting for months would arrive and save him.  He had only 1,238 men with him, and 211 deserted in the days that followed.

Janssens held out in the mountains for a further week.  Baird sent Brigadier General William Beresford to negotiate with him, and the two generals conferred at a farm belonging to Gerhard Croeser near the Hottentots-Holland Mountains on 16 January without reaching agreement. After further consideration, and consultation with his senior officers and advisers, Janssens decided that "the bitter cup must be drunk to the bottom".  He agreed to capitulate, and the final Articles of Capitulation were signed on 18 January.

Uncertainty reigns as to where the Articles of Capitulation were signed.  For many years it has been claimed that it was the Goedeverwachting estate (where a copy of the treaty is on display), but more recent research, published in Dr Krynauw's book Beslissing by Blaauwberg suggests that Croeser's farm (now the Somerset West golf course) may have been the venue.  An article published in the 1820s by the then resident clergyman of the Stellenbosch district, Dr Borcherds, also points towards Croeser's farm.

The terms of the capitulation were reasonably favourable to the Batavian soldiers and citizens of the Cape. Janssens and the Batavian officials and troops were sent back to the Netherlands in March.

The British forces occupied the Cape from 13 August 1814, when the Netherlands ceded the colony to Britain as a permanent possession.  It remained a British colony until it was incorporated into the Union of South Africa on 31 May 1910.

Articles of Capitulation

Summary of the Articles of Capitulation signed by Lt Col Von Prophalow, Maj Gen Baird and Cdre Popham on 10 January 1806:
 Cape Town, the Castle, and circumjacent fortifications were surrendered to Great Britain;
 the garrison became prisoners of war, but officers who were colonists or married to colonists could remain at liberty as long as they behaved themselves;
 officers who were to be repatriated to Europe would be paid up to the date of embarkation and would be transported at British expense;
 all French subjects in the colony must return to Europe;
 inhabitants of Cape Town who had borne arms [i.e. burgher militiamen] could return to their occupations;
 all private property would remain free and untouched;
 all public property was to be inventoried and handed over;
 the burghers and inhabitants would retain all their rights and privileges, including freedom of worship;
 paper money in circulation would remain current;
 the Batavian government property that was to be handed over would serve as security for the paper money;
 prisoners of war would not be pressed into British service or be forced to enlist against their will;
 troops would not be quartered on the citizens of Cape Town;
 the two ships which had been sunk in Table Bay were to be raised by those who had sunk them, repaired, and handed over.

Summary of the Articles of Capitulation signed by Lt Gen Janssens and Brig Gen Beresford on 18 January 1806 and ratified by Maj Gen Baird on 19 January:
 the colony and its dependencies were surrendered to Great Britain;
 the Batavian troops were to move to Simon's Town, with their guns, arms, baggage, and all the honours of war – the officers could retain their swords and horses, but all arms, treasure, public property, and horses were to be handed over;
 the Batavian troops would not be considered to be prisoners;
 Janssens' Hottentot (sic) troops were also to march to Simon's Town, after which they could either return home or join the British forces;
 the British commander-in-chief [Baird] would decide the position of those Batavian troops who were already prisoners of war;
 the British government would bear the expense of the Batavian troops' subsistence until they embarked;
 the Batavian troops would be transported to a port in the Batavian Republic;
 sick men who could not be transported would stay behind, at British expense, and be sent to Holland after they had recovered;
 the rights and privileges allowed to the citizens of Cape Town would also apply to the rest of the colony, except that the British could quarter troops on residents of the country districts;
 once embarked, the Batavian troops would be treated the same as British troops were when on board transport ships;
 Janssens would be allowed to send a despatch to Holland, and the British commanders would assist in forwarding it;
 decisions regarding the continuation of agricultural plans by one Baron van Hogendorp would be left to the future British government;
 any matter arising out of the Articles of Capitulation would be decided justly and honourably without preference to either party.

See also
 Military history of South Africa
 Bloubergstrand, Cape Town

Notes

References

Sources
 Lt Gen Janssens's Report (Cape Archives: ref VC80)

External links
 

1806 in the Cape Colony
Battles involving the Batavian Republic
Battles involving the United Kingdom
Battles of the War of the Third Coalition
Conflicts in 1806
January 1806 events
Military history of the Cape Colony